Mezobromelia bicolor is a plant species in the family Bromeliaceae. This species is native to Ecuador and Colombia.

References

bicolor
Flora of Ecuador
Flora of Colombia
Plants described in 1935